Grand Forks Air Force Base is a census-designated place (CDP) in Grand Forks County, North Dakota, United States. It corresponds to Grand Forks Air Force Base, a United States Air Force installation. As of the 2020 census, the CDP had a population of 2,002.

Demographics

It is part of the "Grand Forks, ND-MN Metropolitan Statistical Area" or "Greater Grand Forks".

As of the census of 2000, there were 4,832 people, 1,279 households, and 1,230 families residing on the base. The population density was 590.5 people per square mile (228.1/km2). There were 1,516 housing units at an average density of 185.2/sq mi (71.6/km2). The racial makeup of the base was 80.9% White, 8.4% Black or African American, 0.9% Native American, 2.4% Asian, 0.3% Pacific Islander, 2.7% from other races, and 4.5% from two or more races. Hispanic or Latino of any race were 6.0% of the population.

There were 1,279 households, out of which 77.3% had children under the age of 18 living with them, 88.5% were married couples living together, 4.1% had a female householder with no husband present, and 3.8% were non-families. 3.0% of all households were made up of individuals, and none had someone living alone who was 65 years of age or older. The average household size was 3.41 and the average family size was 3.48.

On the base the population was spread out, with 38.4% under the age of 18, 20.4% from 18 to 24, 39.4% from 25 to 44, 1.7% from 45 to 64, and 0.1% who were 65 years of age or older. The median age Was 22 years. For every 100 females, there were 115.0 males. For every 100 females age 18 and over, there were 123.9 males.

The median income for a household on the base was $36,414, and the median income for a family was $36,104. Males had a median income of $24,413 versus $17,750 for females. The per capita income for the base was $11,503. About 4.0% of families and 4.2% of the population were below the poverty line, including 3.6% of those under the age of 18 and none of those 65 and older.

References

External links

Census-designated places in North Dakota
Populated places in Grand Forks County, North Dakota